Churah Assembly constituency is one of the 68 constituencies of the Himachal Pradesh Vidhan Sabha. This constituency is reserved for the candidates  to Scheduled castes. It came into existence in 2008, following the delimitation of the Legislative Assembly constituencies and covers most of the area covered by the erstwhile Rajnagar constituency.

Overview
Churah (constituency number 1) is one of the five Vidhan Sabha constituencies located in Chamba district. It covers the entire Churah tehsil and Rajnagar Kanungo Circle of Chamba tehsil. It is part of Kangra Lok Sabha constituency along with 16 other Assembly segments, namely, Chamba, Dalhousie, Bhattiyat, Nurpur, Indora, Fatehpur, Jawali, Jwalamukhi, Jaisinghpur, Sullah, Nagrota, Kangra, Shahpur, Dharamshala, Palampur and Baijnath, Sihunta.

Members of Legislative Assembly

Election candidate

2022

Election results

2017

2012

See also
 List of constituencies of the Himachal Pradesh Legislative Assembly
 Chamba district

References

External links
 

Chamba district
Assembly constituencies of Himachal Pradesh